Commonwealth Stream is a meltwater stream in Taylor Valley which flows east from Commonwealth Glacier into New Harbour of McMurdo Sound. It was studied on the ground during U.S. Navy Operation Deepfreeze, 1957–58, by Troy L. Pewe, who suggested the name in association with Commonwealth Glacier.

References
 

Rivers of Victoria Land
McMurdo Dry Valleys